Ruth Peak is a  glaciated mountain summit located within Olympic National Park in Clallam County of Washington state. Ruth Peak is the third-highest peak in the Bailey Range, which is a subrange of the Olympic Mountains. Its nearest higher neighbor is Mount Carrie,  to the northwest, and Mount Fairchild is set  to the north. In clear weather, the mountain can be seen from the visitor center at Hurricane Ridge. Precipitation runoff from the mountain drains into tributaries of the Hoh and Elwha Rivers. The first ascent of this peak was made in 1961 by Bert Brown, Roy Etten, and Victor Nelson.

Climate

Based on the Köppen climate classification, Ruth Peak is located in the marine west coast climate zone of western North America. This climate supports the Fairchild Glacier on its northeastern slope. Most weather fronts originate in the Pacific Ocean, and travel northeast toward the Olympic Mountains. As fronts approach, they are forced upward by the peaks of the Olympic Range, causing them to drop their moisture in the form of rain or snowfall (Orographic lift). As a result, the Olympics experience high precipitation, especially during the winter months. During winter months, weather is usually cloudy, but, due to high pressure systems over the Pacific Ocean that intensify during summer months, there is often little or no cloud cover during the summer. In terms of favorable weather, the best months for viewing and climbing are July through September.

Geology

The Olympic Mountains are composed of obducted clastic wedge material and oceanic crust, primarily Eocene sandstone, turbidite, and basaltic oceanic crust. The mountains were sculpted during the Pleistocene era by erosion and glaciers advancing and retreating multiple times.

See also

 Olympic Mountains
 Geology of the Pacific Northwest
 Stephen Peak

References

Gallery

External links
 
 National Weather Service: Ruth Peak weather forecast

Olympic Mountains
Mountains of Washington (state)
Landforms of Olympic National Park
North American 2000 m summits